Georg Frederik Ursin (baptised Georg Friderich Krüger; 20 June 1797 – 4 December 1849) was a Danish mathematician and astronomer.

Early life

His father, Georg Jacob Krüger, was a first lieutenant in the Royal Danish Navy, however, in 1798, his was stripped of his functions where was taken to Munkholmen, an islet north of Trondheim, Norway.

In the same year, Ursin was given royal license to carry the maternal family name from his mother, Jacobine Ursin (1772–1819), daughter of rear admiral Ursin, married to a wealthy shipbuilder and shipyard owner Lars Larsen.

Education

In 1814, Ursin passed an exam in land surveying before graduating cum laude from Metropolitanskolen in 1815. Having won a prize assignment involving regular polyhedron, he passed a second exam cum laude.

Death and legacy

Ursin died on December 4, 1849, in Copenhagen.

A DSB Class EA locomotive no. 3020 is named after Ursin.

Danish mathematicians
1797 births
1849 deaths